Ukon Wacka is the seventh studio album by Finnish folk metal band Korpiklaani. It was released on 4 February 2011 through Nuclear Blast. The title refers to an ancient pagan sacrificial feast, dedicated to Ukko. The album is sung in their native language.

Track listing

Tracks 1, 3, 6, 8 and 10 lyrics by Juha Jyrkäs, music by Jonne Järvelä.
Track 2 lyrics by Järvelä, music by Timo Nikki/Teijo Kettula/Teijo Erkinharju.
Track 4 lyrics by Hellevi Hiltunen/Juha "Korppi" Jaakkola, music by Järvelä.
Tracks 5, 7 and 9 lyrics and music by Jonne Järvelä.
Track 2 is a cover of Peer Günt's "Bad Boys Are Here".
Vocals on track 6 by Tuomari Nurmio.

Personnel
Jonne Järvelä - lead vocals, electric & acoustic guitars, mandolin
Jarkko Aaltonen - bass
Matti "Matson" Johansson - drums, backing vocals
Juho Kauppinen - accordion, backing vocals, guitars
Jaakko "Hittavainen" Lemmetty - acoustic and electric violin, jouhikko, tin-whistle, recorder, torupill (bagpipe), mandolin, mouth harp
Kalle "Cane" Savijärvi - guitars, backing vocals

References

Korpiklaani albums
2011 albums
Nuclear Blast albums